Õun is an Estonian surname meaning "apple". As of 1 January 2020, 292 men and 338 women have the surname Õun in Estonia. Õun ranks 152nd for men and 143rd for women in the distribution of surnames in the country. The surname Õun is the most common in Saare County, where 27.73 per 10,000 inhabitants of the county bear the surname. Notable people bearing the surname Õun include:

Aivar Õun (born 1959), Estonian politician
Elmar Õun (1906–1977), Estonian writer
Jan Õun (born 1977), Estonian footballer
Mati Õun (born 1942), Estonian military historian and sportsman
Ülo Õun (1940–1988), Estonian sculptor 
Voldemar Õun (1893–1986), Estonian civil servant and writer

References

Estonian-language surnames